Caconde is a municipality in the state of São Paulo in Brazil. The population is 19,009 (2020 est.) in an area of 468 km².

References

External links

Caconde Brazil
Touristic Information

Municipalities in São Paulo (state)